Uptown McComb (formerly Edgewood Mall) is an enclosed shopping mall located in McComb, Mississippi, United States. The mall is situated at the intersection of Interstate 55 and Veterans Boulevard. The anchor stores are Ross Dress for Less, Aldi, Ashley HomeStore, Marshalls, Hobby Lobby, and Belk. There is 1 vacant anchor store that was once Goody's. The mall currently has over 40 stores and services. Walmart is located next door and Lowe's is located across the boulevard. The mall’s surrounding businesses include Chick-fil-A, McDonald's, First Bank, McComb Urgent Care, Burger King, The Juicy Seafood, Pike National Bank, Marathon, Walgreens, Holiday Inn Express, and Khalaf Plaza. On the other side of I-55 is a B-Kwik Chevron/Mr. Whiskers Fish & Grill, Arby’s, Hampton Inn & Suites, Comfort Inn & Suites, Deerfield Inn, El Dorado Mexican Bar & Grill, Keith White Ford-Lincoln, and more.

History 
Uptown McComb, the first and only enclosed shopping mall in McComb, was built in 1987 by Prescott Sherman. The mall was built on land owned by the Sherman family.

In 1994, the Beall-Ladymon chain was bought out and converted to a Stage in early 1995. Walmart relocated next door as a Supercenter in 1998, and Sears replaced the former Walmart anchor in March 1999. A major overhaul of the mall in 1999 included a  expansion of the JCPenney anchor, construction of an additional  of space for specialty shops, and addition of fourth large anchor, Mississippi-based McRae's.

In 2002, Mississippi Business Journal reported that Prescott Sherman had given $2 million to the School of Engineering at the University of Mississippi from Edgewood Mall. Ashley Furniture HomeStore opened in late 2007, and Stage was converted to Goody’s in September 2011. Sears closed in 2012. Hobby Lobby took one half of the former Sears anchor in 2015. Marshalls took the other half of the former Sears anchor in 2016. Tire Doctor has also set up shop in the former Sears anchor. Edgewood Mall was sold to RockStep Capital in 2017. In 2019, Stage Stores announced that it would convert all of its stores to Gordmans, including the Goody's at Edgewood Mall. This conversion was to supposed to take place in 2020. JCPenney closed in July 2019. Edgewood Mall was renamed Uptown McComb in July 2020. Ross Dress for Less took one half of the former JCPenney anchor in 2022. Aldi took the other half of the former JCPenney anchor in January 2023.

Anchors 
 Ross Dress for Less - opened in one half of the former JCPenney in 2022.
 Aldi - opened in the other half of the former JCPenney in January 2023. Original tenant was JCPenney, which closed in July 2019. 
 Belk - opened as McRae's in 1999, converted to Belk in March 2006.
 Goody's - opened as Beall-Ladymon, The Beall-Ladymon chain was bought out in 1994, and the mall’s Beall-Ladymon location was converted to Stage in early 1995. Stage was later converted to Goody's in September 2011. Goody’s was to be converted to Gordmans in 2020. Closed.
 Ashley HomeStore - opened in late 2007, sold to Lott Furniture Company in September 2008, operated by Pennebaker Enterprises of Hattiesburg, Inc. since July 2014.
 Hobby Lobby - opened in one half of the former Sears in 2015.
 Marshalls - opened in the other half of the former Sears in 2016. Tire Doctor has also set up shop in the former Sears. Opened as Walmart, which relocated next door as a Supercenter in 1998. Reopened as Sears in March 1999, which closed in 2012.

Other stores
Other notable stores include Foot Locker, Hibbett Sports, Rue21, Factory Connection, and a nail salon. A KB Toys, which opened during the mall's 1999 expansion, was closed due to the toy chain's bankruptcy in 2004. The mall's Kirkland's location closed in 2005.

Former features

Mississippi Driver's License Office
The Mississippi Highway Patrol's driver's license office relocated from the Magnolia Community Center in nearby Magnolia to Edgewood Mall in 2001. Opening its doors on September 4, 2001, this office was located at the north entrance of the mall between JCPenney and McRae's.  In February 2007, the Mississippi Department of Public Safety announced that the office was being forced to relocate by the end of March 2007 because their space in the mall had been acquired by another party.

References

External links 
Uptown McComb

Shopping malls in Mississippi
Tourist attractions in Pike County, Mississippi
McComb micropolitan area
Shopping malls established in 1987
Buildings and structures in Pike County, Mississippi
1987 establishments in Mississippi
McComb, Mississippi